Epictia borapeliotes is a species of snakes in the family Leptotyphlopidae.

References

Epictia
Taxa named by Paulo Vanzolini
Reptiles described in 1996